Tayqan (also Romanized as Ţāyqān and Tāyeqān; also known as Dāghān) is a village in Neyzar Rural District, Salafchegan District, Qom County, Qom Province, Iran. At the 2006 census, its population was 703, in 189 families.

References 

Populated places in Qom Province